Sackville Sewer is a minor,  long river (brook) and drainage ditch of the Pevensey Levels in Hailsham, Wealden District of East Sussex, England, that is a tributary to Bowley Sewer.

Course 
Located entirely in the civil parish of Hailsham, Sackville Sewer rises from Pevensey Mill Stream just south of the civil parish of Herstmonceux and flows southwesterly. It eventually turns briefly northerly before flowing a westerly course into Bowley Sewer, fronting an undesignated road.

References 

Rivers of East Sussex
Rivers of the Pevensey Levels